The 2020 Damallsvenskan was the 33rd season of the Swedish women's association football top division, Damallsvenskan. The league was originally set to commence on 3 April 2020, but due to the effects of the COVID-19 pandemic it was postponed, and eventually set to begin on 27 June, and end on 15 November. All matches were played without spectators.

Legandary Umeå IK returned to the top tier after 3 years in Elitettan but were relegated alongside Uppsala again at the end of the season. Göteborg were the champions, claiming their first Damallsvenskan title.

All matches were viewed worldwide, except for Mexico, for a fee at Damallsvenskan TV. Aftonbladet have bought broadcasting rights for all Damallsvenskan matches from 2020 to 2022 and will have them available at Sportbladet Play.

Teams 

Notes:
a According to each club information page previously available at the Swedish Football Association website for Damallsvenskan, unless otherwise noted. Since May 2018 this is no longer present. Numbers were usually lower than official stadium numbers.
b According to Kristianstads DFF's history web page.

Standings

Positions by round

Results

WDL table

Player statistics

Top scorers

Top Assists

References

External links 
 Season at soccerway.com
 Season at SvFF
 Damallsvenskan TV  – Video streaming of all matches both live and archived
 Sportbladet Play  – Video streaming of all matches both live and archived

Damallsvenskan seasons
Sweden
Sweden
2020 in Swedish association football leagues
2020 in Swedish women's football
Damallsvenskan